Isonicotinamide (pyridine-4-carboxamide) is the amide form of isonicotinic acid. It is an isomer of nicotinamide, which has the carboxamide group in the 3-position.

It is soluble in water (191 g/L), and is also soluble in ethanol, DMSO, methanol, chloroform, chloroform/methanol mixtures, and  dioxane (10 mg/L). This compound is used for material synthesis.

Compounds in which the amide nitrogen is connected to another, and then doubly-bonded, are called isonicotinoylhydrazones.

See also
 Nicotinamide
 Nicotinamide adenine dinucleotide

References 

 
4-Pyridyl compounds